These are the election results of the 2018 Malaysian general election by parliamentary constituency. Results are expected to come after 5 pm, 9 May 2018. Elected members of parliament (MPs) will be representing their constituency from the first sitting of 14th Malaysian Parliament to its dissolution.

The parliamentary election deposit was set at RM10,000 per candidate. Similar to previous elections, the election deposit will be forfeited if the particular candidate had failed to secure at least 12.5% or one-eighth of the votes.

General results

Contesting parties

Perlis

Kedah

Kelantan

Terengganu

Penang

Perak

Pahang

Selangor

WP Kuala Lumpur

WP Putrajaya

Negeri Sembilan

Malacca

Johor

WP Labuan

Sabah

Sarawak

References 

General elections in Malaysia
2018 elections in Malaysia
2018 in Malaysia
Election results in Malaysia